Great Coxwell is a village and civil parish  southwest of Faringdon in the Vale of White Horse, England. It was in Berkshire until the 1974 boundary changes transferred it to Oxfordshire. The 2001 Census recorded the parish's population as 274.

Topography
The stream runs in the bottom of a valley that runs roughly from east to west. Part of the parish's western boundary is formed by a brook that joins that stream. The southeast boundary was changed in the 20th century so that it follows the A420 road. Part of the northern boundary is in Badbury Forest. For the remainder the parish is bounded by field boundaries. 

In 1924 the parish covered , but that was before the southeast boundary was revised. The geology of much of the parish is Late Jurassic. The land north of the village is on Kimmeridge Clay, Oxford Clay and Early Cretaceous Lower Greensand.

Badbury Hill

Badbury Hill is in the north of the parish. On its summit is an Iron Age hill fort that was built about 600 BC. There is ancient woodland on its slopes. The hill is in the care of the National Trust.

Toponym
The Domesday Book of 1086 records the toponym as Cocheswelle. 13th- and 14th-century records call it Great Cokewell or Cokeswell. In 15th-century records it is Cokeswylle or Cokyswell. The earliest known record of the modern spelling Coxwell is from the 18th century. The two parishes share a common boundary.

Manor
The Domesday Book records that King Harold held the manor before the Norman Conquest of England. Great Coxwell was a large manor, which the Domesday Book of 1086 recorded as 20 hides.  When the Cistercian Beaulieu Abbey in Hampshire was founded in 1204–05, King John endowed it with a group of manors that were headed by Great Faringdon and included Great Coxwell. The abbey retained the manors until 1538, when it was forced to surrender all its properties to the Crown in the Dissolution of the Monasteries.  In 1540 the Crown sold the manor of Great Coxwell to a local landholder, William Morys (or Morris). Under Queen Elizabeth I the Morris family were recusants. In 1580 the Mass was secretly celebrated at Court House Farm in Great Coxwell. In 1581 Francis Morris, grandson of William Morys, was jailed in the Fleet Prison in London for sheltering the Jesuit priest Edmund Campion.

The Morris family held the estate until 1638 when it was sold to George Pratt, who already held the neighbouring estate of Coleshill. The Pratt family held both Great Coxwell and Coleshill estates until 1700, when they were sold to George Pratt Richmond, also known as Webb. The estate was still in the Webb family early in the 19th century.  Some decades later Ernest Cook (1865–1955), grandson of the pioneer travel agent Thomas Cook, acquired numerous estates including Coleshill, and thus Great Coxwell. Cook left his estates to the National Trust.

Great Coxwell Barn

On the northern edge of the village is a Medieval barn that was built about 1292 for Beaulieu Abbey to store the crop of its monastic grange. It is a Grade I listed building and a Scheduled Ancient Monument. The barn is now owned by the National Trust, which has been restored and is open to the public.

Parish church
The Church of England parish church of Saint Giles is on a ridge in the southern part of the village. Parts of the church date from about 1200. The west tower was added in the 15th century.  The tower has a ring of five bells. Henry Bagley of Chacombe cast the treble, third and fourth bell in 1738. James Wells of Aldbourne, Wiltshire cast the second bell in 1824. Mears and Stainbank of the Whitechapel Bell Foundry  cast the tenor bell in 1911. There is also a Sanctus bell that John Taylor cast in 1839, presumably at his then foundry in Oxford. The bells are currently unringable.  The churchyard is now managed for wildlife. It has more than 100 species of wild flower, including wild clary, Salvia verbenaca.

Public transport
Stagecoach West Gold bus route S6 between Swindon and Oxford via Faringdon passes east of the village on the A420 road. Buses run generally every 20 minutes from Mondays to Saturdays and every 30 minutes on Sundays.

References

Sources

External links

Great Coxwell

Civil parishes in Oxfordshire
Villages in Oxfordshire